ISO 3166-2:SL is the entry for Sierra Leone in ISO 3166-2, part of the ISO 3166 standard published by the International Organization for Standardization (ISO), which defines codes for the names of the principal subdivisions (e.g., provinces or states) of all countries coded in ISO 3166-1.

Currently for Sierra Leone, ISO 3166-2 codes are defined for 1 area and 4 provinces. The Western Area contains the capital of the country Freetown and has special status equal to the provinces.

Each code consists of two parts, separated by a hyphen. The second part is 1 or 2 letters.

Current codes
Subdivision names are listed as in the ISO 3166-2 standard published by the ISO 3166 Maintenance Agency (ISO 3166/MA).

Click on the button in the header to sort each column.

Changes
The following changes to the entry are listed on ISO's online catalogue, the Online Browsing Platform:

See also
 Subdivisions of Sierra Leone
 FIPS region codes of Sierra Leone

External links
 ISO Online Browsing Platform: SL
 Provinces of Sierra Leone, Statoids.com

2:SL
ISO 3166-2
Sierra Leone geography-related lists
Subdivisions of Sierra Leone